The 2016 BNP Paribas Primrose Bordeaux was a professional tennis tournament played on clay courts. It was the ninth edition of the tournament which was part of the 2016 ATP Challenger Tour. It took place in Bordeaux, France between 9 and 15 May 2016.

Singles main-draw entrants

Seeds

 1 Rankings are as of May 2, 2016.

Other entrants
The following players received wildcards into the singles main draw:
  Mathias Bourgue
  Maxime Janvier
  Tristan Lamasine
  Constant Lestienne

The following player received entry as a special exempt into the singles main draw:
  Thiago Monteiro

The following player received entry as an alternate into the singles main draw:
  Quentin Halys

The following players received entry from the qualifying draw:
  Jonathan Eysseric 
  Calvin Hemery
  Daniil Medvedev 
  Tommy Paul

Champions

Singles

 Rogério Dutra Silva def.  Bjorn Fratangelo, 6–3, 6–1

Doubles

  Johan Brunström /  Andreas Siljeström def.  Guillermo Durán /  Máximo González, 6–1, 3–6, [10–4]

External links
Official Website

BNP Paribas Primrose Bordeaux
BNP Paribas Primrose Bordeaux
2016 in French tennis